Caroline Wozniacki was the defending champion, and won in the final 6–2, 6–4 against Elena Vesnina.

Seeds

  Svetlana Kuznetsova (quarterfinals)
  Caroline Wozniacki (champion)
  Flavia Pennetta (semifinals)
  Nadia Petrova (first round)
  Agnieszka Radwańska (second round; retired due to right hand injury)
  Marion Bartoli (second round; retired due to a left adductor strain)
  Dominika Cibulková (withdrew due to right rib injury)
  Amélie Mauresmo (semifinals)
  Samantha Stosur (second round)

Draw

Finals

Top half

Bottom half

External links
 WTA tournament draws

Women's Singles